Mexico is an unincorporated community in Carroll County, Maryland, United States. It lies at an elevation of 968 feet (295 m).

References

Unincorporated communities in Maryland
Unincorporated communities in Carroll County, Maryland